Luis Alfonso Torrens Sáez (born May 2, 1996) is a Venezuelan professional baseball catcher in the Chicago Cubs organization. He has previously played in Major League Baseball (MLB) for the San Diego Padres and Seattle Mariners.

Career

New York Yankees
Torrens signed with the New York Yankees as an international free agent on July 2, 2012. He made his professional debut in 2013 for the Gulf Coast League Yankees. In 2014, he played for the Charleston RiverDogs, Gulf Coast Yankees and Staten Island Yankees.

In March 2015, Torrens had surgery to repair a torn labrum in his right shoulder, which ended his 2015 season. He returned from the injury in 2016 and played in 52 games with Staten Island and Charleston.

San Diego Padres
In the 2016 Rule 5 draft, the Cincinnati Reds selected Torrens from the Yankees. Immediately after taking Torrens, the Reds traded him to the San Diego Padres. Torrens joined the Padres' Opening Day roster as a 20-year-old, never having played above single-A. Torrens, along with Héctor Sánchez, served as a back-up to catcher Austin Hedges during the 2017 season. He started 31 games for the Padres overall, but saw less time as the season progressed, making only 6 starts and 29 plate appearances over the final two months of the season.  Torrens finished 2017 with 20 hits in 123 at-bats, including 3 doubles and a triple.

Torrens played for the Navegantes del Magallanes in the Venezuelan Winter League in the MLB off-season. During spring training in 2018, Torrens battled an oblique injury, and then was optioned to the San Antonio Missions of the Double-A Texas League on March 14. Torrens played for the Amarillo Sod Poodles of the Texas League in 2019, and was promoted to the major leagues on September 16.

Seattle Mariners 
On August 30, 2020, the Padres traded Torrens, Taylor Trammell, Ty France, and Andrés Muñoz to the Seattle Mariners for Austin Nola, Austin Adams, and Dan Altavilla. 

In 2020, between the two teams, on defense he led all major league catchers in passed balls, with six.

In 2021, Torrens batted .243/.299/.431 with 15 home runs and 47 RBIs in 108 games.

On August 11, 2022, Torrens was designated for assignment. On August 14, he was outrighted to the Triple-A Tacoma Rainiers. He batted .279 in 16 games for Tacoma and was promoted to the major leagues on September 21.

On October 4, 2022, Torrens recorded the sixth pitching win by a position player since 1960. He pitched the top of the 10th inning, giving up one hit and no earned runs against the Detroit Tigers.

On November 18, 2022, Torrens was non tendered and became a free agent.

Chicago Cubs
On January 25, 2023, Torrens signed a minor league contract with the Chicago Cubs organization.

See also
 List of Major League Baseball players from Venezuela
 Rule 5 draft results

References

External links

1996 births
Living people
Sportspeople from Valencia, Venezuela
Venezuelan expatriate baseball players in the United States
Major League Baseball players from Venezuela
Major League Baseball catchers
San Diego Padres players
Seattle Mariners players
Gulf Coast Yankees players
Staten Island Yankees players
Charleston RiverDogs players
Navegantes del Magallanes players
Lake Elsinore Storm players
Amarillo Sod Poodles players
Tacoma Rainiers players
Everett AquaSox players